Marjana Chowdhury (born 10 November 1993) is a Bangladeshi-American model, philanthropist, and beauty queen. She was most recently crowned Miss Alaska World 2019 and competed in October 2019 for the title of Miss World America 2019, where she placed in the Top 25. She was Miss Bangladesh 2017 and represented Bangladesh at the Miss Asia Pacific International pageant in the Philippines in November, 2017. She previously won the 2016 Miss Bangladesh USA competition, which was the first pageant she entered. Chowdhury is currently working at an investment management firm in New York City.

Early life 
Marjana Chowdhury was born in Sylhet, Bangladesh in 1993. In 1994, her family left Bangladesh and settled in New York City, United States. She is the second of four daughters.

Pageants

Miss Bangladesh US 2016 
In August 2016, Chowdhury won the Miss Bangladesh US competition. She was selected to represent Bangladesh in the Miss Asia Pacific International competition in the Philippines that year but was unable to participate due to modesty concerns.

America's Miss World 2017 
In August 2017, Chowdhury participated in the America's Miss World competition. She placed in the Top 16, and was honored with a top 5 spot in the Beauty with a Purpose competition for her work with the 501(c)3 organization, The Young Women's Leadership Network. She also received the Charity Award from Dr. Phillips Charities and the Best Buddies programs.

Miss Bangladesh 2017 
In August 2017, Chowdhury was honored with the title of Miss Bangladesh 2017.

Miss Asia Pacific International 2018 
In October 2018, Chowdhury represented Bangladesh on the international stage at the 2018 Miss Asia Pacific International pageant and placed in the Top 20 of the competition.

Miss Alaska World 2019 
In 2019, Chowdhury competed for the title of Miss Alaska World 2019 and won.

Miss World America 2019 
In October 2019, Chowdhury represented Alaska on the national stage competing for the title of Miss World America 2019 in Las Vegas, Nevada and placed in the Top 25.

Education and other achievements 
Chowdhury attended the Young Women's Leadership School of East Harlem, New York from 2005 to 2011 and graduated as valedictorian of her class. In 2011, she received first prize at the New York City Science and Engineering Fair and represented New York as a finalist for the Intel International Science and Engineering Fair with her peer Maryama Diaw.

The pair's winning project assessed the reproductive success of the Gambusia holbrooki, used as a surrogate to the darter species. Results from this inquiry were important to the reintroduction of the formerly endangered species, the Okaloosa darter, into suitable stream systems to ensure population success. Chowdhury and Diaw's efforts in collaboration with the U.S. Fish and Wildlife Service, the Biology Department of Loyola University, the Florida Fish and Wildlife Conservation Commission, and other students from the Young Women's Leadership School of East Harlem helped to reclassify the Etheostoma okaloosae from the status of endangered to threatened under the Endangered Species Act.

Chowdhury earned her Bachelor of Arts degree from Columbia College, Columbia University, in 2015. In 2013, she participated with a team consisting of other Columbia University and Cooper Union members in the International Genetic Engineering and Machines Competition. Her team took home a bronze prize for their project on a synthetic biology approach to etch copper in order to redefine the manufacturing of printed circuit boards.

Chowdhury was also a Gates Millennium Scholar and Albert Shanker Scholar. In her final year at Columbia University, she received a King's Crown Leadership Award distinguishing her as a Senior Marshal, an honor bestowed upon members of the graduating class who have demonstrated achievement in their academics and extracurricular activities. She was also distinguished at graduation with a graduation cord presented by the Office of Multicultural Affairs (OMA) Recipients of this cord have demonstrated an outstanding commitment to diversity, social justice, and multiculturalism through the OMA, campus leadership, community involvement, academic endeavors, and/or personal dedication.

Philanthropy 
Chowdhury is a member of the Student Leadership Network (SLN) and its CollegeBound Initiative (CBI). She graduated as a SLN and CBI alum in 2011 and has been volunteering with the organization since then as a mentor to underprivileged middle and high-school students undergoing the college admissions process. She is also a member of the organization's junior board, Next Gen. In 2019, Chowdhury was an honoree at the Collegebound Initiative Gala for her work with the organization.

Chowdhury is also a member of the Robin Hood Foundation's young professionals' network, PYT. She serves as a liaison for the program at the asset management firm where she works, assisting in the organization and coordination of different charity projects volunteering with many of New York's notable philanthropic organizations with members of her firm.

In 2016, Chowdhury served as an assistant facilitator with Rikers Story Bot, one of several programs offered by the Rikers Education Project, a collaboration of the Center for Justice at Columbia University and the Heyman Center for the Humanities at Columbia University. The program allowed teenage inmates at Rikers Island to work alongside Columbia University members and students to learn the basics of the programming language Python, to tweet about their personal experiences, and to contribute code to Rikers Story Bot.

References 

1993 births
Bangladeshi female models
American female models
American models of Bangladeshi descent
Living people
People from Sylhet
Columbia College (New York) alumni
21st-century American women